Šeštokai is a small town in southern Lithuania.

Infrastructure 
The town is a transport hub as it hosts Šeštokai Intermodal Terminal and has dual gauge track as well as break-of-gauge for the 1435 mm standard gauge and 1520 mm broad gauge. It is also a major rail junction on the Rail Baltica I line from Poland to the city of Kaunas.

References

Towns in Alytus County
Towns in Lithuania